Peter Jacob Wexler (1923–2002) was a British Romance scholar and lexicographer.

Life and work
He received his doctorate from Sorbonne in 1951 on La formation du vocabulaire des chemins de fer en France, 1778–1842 (The Development of Railway Jargon in France, 1778–1842). He first taught at the University of Manchester, then at the University of Essex. Wexler contributed many materials for Bernard Quemada's Matériaux pour l'histoire du vocabulaire français. He also contributed 50,000 quotations to the Oxford English Dictionary, including over 500 first datings of words. He also published in Cahiers de lexicologie.

References 
 A Festschrift for Peter Wexler: Studies Presented to Peter Wexler by His Friends and Colleagues on the Occasion of His Sixtieth Birthday, Jacques Durand, University of Essex, 1983

External links 
 http://david.fremlin.de/wexler/Pplx.html ("A Teacher's Perplexicon", includes photograph)
 https://web.archive.org/web/20081019060635/http://oed.hertford.ox.ac.uk/main/content/view/337/359/
 Peter Wexler Papers, University of Manchester Library

British lexicographers
Academics of the University of Essex
Academics of the University of Manchester
1923 births
2002 deaths
College of Sorbonne alumni
University of Paris alumni
British expatriates in France
20th-century lexicographers